LuAZ (short for "Луцький автомобільний завод", Lutskyi avtomobilnyi zavod; Lutsk automobile factory) is a Ukrainian automobile manufacturer in the city Lutsk built in the Soviet Union. Since 2009 it is known as Bogdan Motors Assembly Plant #1.

History

The factory was founded in 1951, and was known as LARZ (Lutskyi AvtoRemontnyi Zavod, Lutsk Automobile Repair Plant) and from 1955 as LuMZ (Lutskyi Mashynobudivnyi Zavod, Lutsk Machinebuilding Plant). Along with truck repairs, the early products of this relatively small plant were mobile repair shop and refrigerated truck bodies on Moskvitch, ZIL, and UAZ frames.

Its first original design is the sturdy and simple LuAZ-967 off-road vehicle for the Red Army. It originated after the Korean War, when the Soviets saw a need for small off-road vehicles comparable to the American Jeep, to supplement the overly-large and -heavy GAZ-69s then in service. Developed at NAMI (the National Automobile Institute), the prototype, known as NAMI 049, was completed in 1958.

LuAZ's civilian products suffered such a reputation for poor quality, "for a time the LuAZ was the only car that could be bought off the shelf by Soviet motorists".

Mergers and acquisitions
The abbreviation of LuAZ exists since 1967. The company was once part of AvtoZAZ holding, but now is a part of the Bogdan group, which also controls bus manufacturing facilities in Cherkasy.

In 2005, LuAZ started assembly of Hyundai and Kia cars from CKD kits, with production set to further expand in 2006.

Recent developments
A major expansion program is planned, which will see construction of a new car manufacturing facility in Cherkasy including a new paint shop, with planned annual assembly of around 60,000 Ladas and 60,000 Hyundais and Kias from 2007. Passenger car production will be transferred from Luts'k to Cherkasy, while bus production will move to Luts'k.

Incidents
From the period of 1984 through 2002, 67 people were killed by faulty exhaust systems. Apparently, toxic carbon monoxide entered the cabin via the ventilation vents and asphyxiated the occupants.

LuAZ vehicles have been notorious for poor crash test ratings. Consequently, countless people have been ejected from these vehicles in accidents. Seatbelts did not become optional until the 2006 model year.

Vehicles 
 LuAZ 967 a four-wheeled amphibian (1961-1989)
 LuAZ 969V "Volyn" (1967–72)
 LuAZ 969 "Volyn" (1971-1975)
 LuAZ 969A "Volyn" (1975-1979)
 LuAZ 969M "Volyn" with Zaporozhets 40 hp engine (1979-1996)
 LuAZ 970 6x4 amphibian prototype (mid 1980s)
 LuAZ 1301 few prototypes build (1984, 1990, 2002)
 LuAZ 13019 a six-wheeled pick-up version of 1301 prototype (1990)
 LuAZ 1302 "Volyn" a modernized version of the 969M with Tavria 53 hp engine (1992-2002)
 LuAZ 13021 "Volyn" a pick-up version of 1302 (1991-1998)
 LuAZ 1901 "Geolog" a 6x6 amphibian  prototype (1999)
 LuAZ 2403 airport tractor (1979-1992)
 LuAZ Proto prototype (1988)

Gallery

See also
 Automobile model numbering system in USSR and Russia

References 

 Ukraine Lada Assembler LuAZ Adds Hyundai, Kia by Peter Homola, Wards Auto, November 8, 2005.

External links

 LuAZ-Amphib restoration 
 Official site
 LuAZ-fan site
 LuAZ-fan site
LUAZ at Autosoviet website

1950s cars
1960s cars
1970s cars
1980s cars
1990s cars
2000s cars
Truck manufacturers of Ukraine
Car manufacturers of the Soviet Union
Vehicle manufacturing companies established in 1955
Car manufacturers of Ukraine
LuAZ
Companies based in Lutsk